Malaysia competed at the 2017 World Games held in Wrocław, Poland.

Medalists

Squash 

Nicol David won the bronze medal in the women's singles competition.

References 

Nations at the 2017 World Games
2017 in Malaysian sport
2017